

Works published
, a pastorela by Joan Esteve

Events
Summer — five troubadours compose a literary cycle of sirventes on the topic of the Aragonese Crusade: Bernart d'Auriac, Peter III of Aragon, Pere Salvatge, Roger Bernard III of Foix, and an anonymous.

Births

Deaths
 Peter III of Aragon (born 1239), an Occitan troubadour and King of Aragon

13th-century poetry
Poetry